Arden is the name of two unincorporated communities in the U.S. state of West Virginia.

Arden, Barbour County, West Virginia
Arden, Berkeley County, West Virginia